Chandap (also spelled as Chandup) is a village in the Sabarkantha district of Gujarat, in western India.

History 
Chandap was a petty princely state, also comprising three more villages. It was a Matadari village without Chieftains and part of the Gadhwara thana, in Mahi Kantha and rules by Koli shareholders.

It had a combined population of 588 in 1901, yielding a state revenue of 546 Rupees (1903-4, only from land) and paid double tribute: 71 Rupees to the Gaekwar Baroda State and 217 Rupees to Idar State.

Rebellion 
In September 1857, Koli chieftain of Chandap Nathuji Koli revolted against British Raj and collected a Koli army of numbering 2000 souls. The Kolis of Chandup killed the ten horsemen of Baroda State and challenged the authority. The Koli rebels and Nathaji were joined by Koli chieftain of Khanpur named Thakur Soorajmal. The Government took a stiff attitude against koli rebels and the Kolis under the leadership of Nathaji continued their resistance from the hills. Chandap was rehabited on the new site but there were only a few Kolis. On a doubt of helping the Koli rebels, 14 inhabitants of Chandap were apprehended by the Government, but after long enquiry they were released on account of lack of information.

Sources and external links 
 Imperial Gazetteer, on dsal.uchicago.edu - Mahi Kantha

References

Villages in Sabarkantha district
Princely states of Gujarat